Lobocneme is a genus consisting of 3 species of mantises in the tribe Oxyopsidini.

Species
The Mantodea Species File lists:
Lobocneme colombiae Hebard, 1919
Lobocneme icterica Saussure & Zehntner, 1894 
Lobocneme lobipes Brunner & Redtenbacher, 1892

See also
List of mantis genera and species

References

Stagmatopterinae
Mantodea genera